Black Ben Carson (stylized in all lowercase) is the debut studio album by American rapper JPEGMafia. It was self-released on February 15, 2016. The album was supported by the three singles "You Think You Know", "I Smell Crack" and "Digital Blackface". Black Ben Carson was named after the only black 2016 presidential candidate Ben Carson, who was running Republican.

The album is split into two sides; Side A being "hip hop in its rawest form – loud, angry, political, and self-aware" and Side B with a more introspective, mellow and calm sound.

The album was originally released with a different cover art in 2016, but was later (2020) removed and replaced with a new mix of the album, with many differences from the original, a shorter runtime (original release ran for 75 minutes) and all the instrumentals for each track, making the re-release 38 tracks and 146 minutes long. 
These instrumental tracks had unusual titles, like "bbc" for the "Black Ben Carson" instrumental, and "uncured bacon" for the "I Just Killed A Cop Now I'm Horny" instrumental.
These titles were then replaced with "*song title* (Instrumental)" in January 2021 on all streaming platforms.

Black Ben Carson was named the best Baltimore album of 2016 by the Baltimore City Paper.

Track listing
All Tracks Are Produced by JPEGMafia. 

Notes
 All song titles stylized in lowercase, except "All Caps No Spaces", stylized in all caps.

Notes
1.Except "The 27 Club", originally released in 2012 on his mixtape The Rockwood Escape Plan.

References

2016 debut albums
JPEGMafia albums
Albums produced by JPEGMafia